Namakgale is a large township lying 12 km outside Phalaborwa in Mopani District in the Limpopo province of South Africa. Its nearest neighbouring townships are Lulekani, Makhushane, Maseke and Mashishimale on the R71 road to Gravelotte (GaMaenetje). It is next to the Kruger National Park on the north eastern part of the Limpopo province previously Northern Transvaal. The township enjoys the annual Marula festival during the months of February and March, when the ripe Marula fruit harvest is at its peak, and the Marula traditional beer is brewed. This is home to the Amarula liqueur is harvested, and the pulp is shipped to Cape Town for further processing. The citizens of Namakgale will enjoy the Mopani worms first harvest during March and April, and the second harvest in December. the Mopani tree and the Morula tree are very important to the residents of the Namakgale as they bring important community subsistence farming.

Schools and Institutions of Learning

Colleges
 Mopani TVET College (TVET:Technical and Vocational Education and Training)

High schools
 Relebogile High School
 Vuxeni High School
 Sebalamakgolo High School
 Maphokwane High School
 Lebeko High School
 Lepato High School
 Makikele High School
 Matome Malatgi

Primary schools
 Gaza Primary School
 Kgopsane Primary School
 Mhala Mhala Primary School
 Namakgale Primary School
 Phalaborwa Primary School
 Refentse Primary School
 Refilwe Primary School
 Rethabile Primary School
 Rethusitswe Primary School
 Stanbury Higher Primary School
 Mashishimale Primary School
 Mabine Primary School
 Mathibela Primary School

Demographics
Namakgale is largely inhabited by migrant labourers and their descendants. Most of this migrant labourers originate from the Bolobedu area, Tzaneen, Ga-Sekororo and Bushbuckridge. Most of the people in Namakgale are employed in mining, namely Palabora Mining Company, Sasol Agri and FOSKOR.

The majority of the residence of Namakgale speak Northern Sotho language, with the Sepulana, KhePhalaborwa and KheLobedu dialects being the most predominantly spoken forms, is the first language of about 70% of the people. The N'walungu variety of Xitsonga is the second most spoken language after Northern Sotho; XiTsonga is first language of about 30% of the people.

The Residents of the neighbouring villages of Ga-Makhushane, Ga-Mashishimale, Ga-Maseke and Ga-Selwane are proudly called Ba-Phalaborwa ba ga Malatji, a North Sotho tribe of Kalanga extraction. The Malatji Royal Family venerates the Totem of the Noko, a Porcupine and the clan is generally called Dinoko as a symbol of respect.

Sports facilities
 Namakgale Stadium
 Phosphate Club Stadium

Notable people
 Pule Mabe, ANC national spokesperson
 Sipho Mashele, cricketer

References

Populated places in the Ba-Phalaborwa Local Municipality
1959 establishments in South Africa